The Idaho–Idaho State rivalry, recently branded as the Battle of the Domes, is the intrastate college football game in Idaho between the University of Idaho in Moscow and Idaho State University in Pocatello.

The series was played annually for 31 seasons from 1965 through 1995, until Idaho's move to the Football Bowl Subdivision (with Boise State), leaving Idaho State without an intrastate rival. Annual play has resumed since Idaho's move back to the Football Championship Subdivision in 2018. The rivalry was at its most competitive in the 1970s and 1980s, with neither team three-peating; Idaho has won thirteen of the last sixteen and leads the overall series at  Since Idaho's return to the FCS, the Vandals lead the trophy series at 3–2.

A notable game of the series was not even played. In the conference finale for both teams in 1978, a night game was scheduled for Moscow on November 11, and ISU planned to fly up to the Palouse that Saturday afternoon in two vintage airplanes. One developed engine trouble shortly after takeoff from Pocatello and returned. Both teams were at the bottom of the Big Sky standings and the game was not rescheduled; Idaho was granted a  

{| class=wikitable style="text-align:center; float:right; clear:right; margin-left:1em; font-size:88%;"
|+ College Comparison
! 
! style="" | Idaho
! style="" | Idaho State
|-
! scope=row | Location 
| Moscow || Pocatello
|-
! scope=row | Conference 
| colspan=2 align=center|Big Sky
|-
! scope=row | Students 
| 11,303|| 12,157
|-
! scope=row | School colors 
| Silver & Gold|| Orange & Black
|-
! scope=row | Nickname 
| Vandals || Bengals
|-
! scope=row | Mascot(s) 
| Joe Vandal || Benny
|-
! scope=row | Football stadium 
|Kibbie Dome||  Holt Arena
|}

Battle of the Domes
The "Battle of the Domes" theme began in 2017, and is applied to multiple sports. In opposite regions of Idaho and in different time zones, the driving distance between the campuses is over  through Boise, and over  if routed through western Montana and Coeur d'Alene, a popular choice as it is mostly interstate. The Battle of the Domes is currently sponsored by Idaho Central Credit Union.

Idaho State was the first of the pair to play its home games indoors, opening Holt Arena (originally ASISU Minidome) in 1970. The Kibbie Dome in Moscow was enclosed in 1975, after four years as an outdoor venue; the last two outdoor games in this series were played there in 1971  and 1973, then known as new 

From 1971 through 2010, Idaho's primary intrastate rivalry in football was with Boise State.

Battle of the Domes trophy 

With the introduction of the Battle of the Domes branding in 2018, a traveling trophy was also introduced. The Battle of the Domes trophy is prominently green (representing Idaho Central Credit Union's colors), and is mounted on a wooden base. There are 20 small plaques located on the base of the trophy, which are filled in after every football game between the two, detailing the winner, date, and score. The winner of the overall Battle of the Domes competition is awarded temporary possession of the trophy. Idaho and Idaho State have won the trophy twice since the rivalry renewed on an annual basis; Idaho in 2019 and 2021, Idaho State in 2018 and 2020.

Notable games

1916: The first game 
The first game between the rivals was held in Pocatello on November 27, 1916. The Vandals brushed aside the Bengals on route to a 32–0 shutout.

1962: First game in Moscow 
Both the 1916 and 1929 games were in Pocatello; 1962 marks the first time that the rivalry game was played on the Palouse in Moscow. Host Idaho won a low scoring 9–6 game.

1969: Idaho State's first win 
Idaho State finally snapped the Vandals' eight-game winning streak in 1969 when ISU won 47–42. The game, held in Pullman, Washington, was Idaho State's first-ever win against Idaho. They won again the following year, the first indoors at the new Minidome (now Holt Arena) and the rivalry remained competitive over the next two decades.

1975: Kibbie Dome opener 
In the first game inside the newly-enclosed Kibbie Dome in September 1975, visiting Idaho State spoiled the party with a 29–14 win.

1978: The forfeit game 
The two schools were scheduled to play at night in Moscow on November 11, 1978, but transportation issues caused Idaho State to forfeit, giving Idaho a 1–0 win. On game day, one of two vintage aircraft carrying the ISU team had mechanical issues and returned to Pocatello; it remains the closest game in the series, even though it technically wasn't played.

1995: Idaho leaves I-AA 
On September 30, 1995, Idaho State played Idaho in Division I-AA (now Football Championship Subdivision) for what seemed like the final time, as Idaho moved up to Division I-A (now Football Bowl Subdivision) a year later. Idaho State managed to beat Idaho 26–21, also snapping a seven game losing streak in the process.

2018: Battle of the Domes 
Idaho rejoined the FCS in 2018, which also renewed the decade-stagnant rivalry. Now dubbed the "Battle of the Domes," Idaho State easily won 62–28 in the first game under the new branding.

Universities
The University of Idaho was established  in 1889 by the territorial legislature and opened its doors three years later. Idaho State's origins date back to 1901; it was a two-year branch campus of the UI (1927–1947), became a four-year college in 1947, and a university in 1963.

Accomplishments

Game results

^ Idaho State forfeited in 1978 due to transportation issues.

 Eight non-conference games: 1916, 1929, 1962, 1963, 1997, 1998, 2006, 2008
 Not played in 63 seasons: 1917–1928, 1930–1961, 1964, 1996, 1999–2005, 2007, 2009–2017

Big Sky games 
Both schools were charter members of the Big Sky Conference, which launched in 1963. In conference play, Idaho leads the series  through 2021. Idaho State was previously a member of the Rocky Mountain Athletic Conference. Idaho joined conference play for football in 1965, after six seasons (1959–1964) as an independent; they left for Division I-A (FBS) in 1996, and returned to FCS in 2018.

Coaching records 
Since first game in 1916

Idaho

Idaho State

Miscellaneous

Locations 
The rivalry game has been held in 4 different locations in 2 different states. Pocatello has held the most games with 22, followed by Moscow with 19, then Boise and Pullman, both with 1.

*the 2020 season was delayed due to Covid-19, instead taking place in spring 2021

See also  
 List of NCAA college football rivalry games

References 

College football rivalries in the United States
Big Sky Conference rivalries
Idaho Vandals football
Idaho State Bengals football